Emma Myles is an American actress best known for her recurring role as Leanne Taylor on the Netflix original series Orange Is the New Black. She was friends with fellow actress Dascha Polanco before being cast on the show, having met her after they both auditioned for a guest role on ''Law & Order: Special Victims Unit.

Filmography

Film

Television

Personal life
Myles is married to film actor Darcy Cadman.

References

External links
 
 

Living people
Place of birth missing (living people)
Year of birth missing (living people)
21st-century American actresses
American television actresses
American film actresses